Naevochromis chrysogaster is a species of cichlid endemic to Lake Malawi where it prefers areas with rocky substrates. This species has a specialized diet, feeding on the fry and larvae of other cichlids. This species is also seen in the aquarium trade and sometimes goes by the name Haplochromis Jack Dempsey. It is currently the only known member of the genus Naevochromis.

References

Haplochromini
Monotypic fish genera
Fish of Lake Malawi
Taxa named by Ethelwynn Trewavas
Fish described in 1935
Taxonomy articles created by Polbot